Long Island, a large island directly south of New England, has made attempts in the past to secede from New York and become its own state. Mentions of Long Island secession range from 1896 to 2010. The proposed 51st state has also speculated the combination of Nassau and Suffolk counties into one county in order to reduce costs.

The state of Long Island would include over 2.7 million people, not including the more populous west end of the island. Nassau County executive Ed Mangano came out in support of such a proposal in April 2010 and was said to be commissioning a study on it.

Under Article Four, Section 3, clause 1 of the federal Constitution, both the New York State Legislature and the United States Congress would need to approve any secession from New York. The State Legislature has thus far resisted all attempts at secession.

The Long Island statehood movement has been featured on the History Channel series How the States Got Their Shapes.

Secession history

The first known proposal of Long Island as its own state was published in The New York Times in 1896. Sugar refiner Adolph Molenhaur claimed other big cities in New York did not take Long Island into account when making decisions and were spending money without any benefit to Long Island's interests.

In 1996, a non-binding vote took place in which the idea of secession was approved. However, no further action was taken at that time.

On March 28, 2008, Suffolk County, New York comptroller Joseph Sawicki proposed a plan that would make Long Island (specifically, Nassau and Suffolk counties) the 51st state of the United States of America (or, should Upstate New York and/or Western New York be included in the breakup of New York State, the 52nd or 53rd). Sawicki said that all the Long Island taxpayers' money would stay on Long Island, rather than the funds being dispersed all over the entire state of New York.

In 2009, there was a call for home rule of Long Island by political leaders who were angry about a tax. Suffolk County was on board with the plan but Nassau County showed no support.

In 2010, the Nassau County Executive Ed Mangano had a plan to combine Nassau and Suffolk counties and to secede from New York and wanted to formally look into the idea.

Supporters vs. non-supporters

Supporters see secession not only as a major way to save money, but also as a way to keep Long Island unique, and to refrain from unwanted changes being made by New York state. The non-supporters do not agree with the logistics behind creating a separate state and do not think that the state and the government would agree to it.

An extreme supporter is Cesidio Tallini. He created a micronation named Winnecomac, originally named Independent Long Island until February 2nd 2013, special code "WQ", which aims for the entire island of Long Island to become a nation separate from the United States. This idea was not popular among Long Islanders, but has gained attention from the media. Tallini was featured in the 2011 History Channel series How the States Got their Shapes, as well as in a 2007 article in The New York Times.

See also
 Secession in New York

References

External links
 Flag of Long Island (Wikipedia Commons)
 "Trying Again and Again to Secede", Clyde Haberman, The New York Times, April 30, 2009.
 "Modern-Day US Secessionists: An Interactive Map", Nick Baumann, Dave Gilson, & Tim Murphy, Mother Jones, November/December 2010.
 "Scotland vs. Long Island: What would they be like independent?", Newsday.com staff, Newsday, September 18, 2014.

Proposed states and territories of the United States
Long Island